Maltz (from  - malt) is a surname of German and Jewish as well.

 Albert Maltz, American writer
 Carlos Maltz
 Maxwell Maltz
 Michael Maltz

Organizations 
 Ben Maltz Gallery
 Maltz Museum of Jewish Heritage

Fiction 
 Maltz, a Klingon in Star Trek III; see List_of_Star_Trek_characters:_G-M#M

See also
Malz